Rein Arjukese (20 February 1941 – 14 July 2018) was an Estonian naturalist, dissident during the Soviet era, and politician. He was a member of VII Riigikogu.

Arjukuse was born in Tartu and died at age 77 in Vetepere. In 2001, he was awarded the Order of the White Star, Medal Class.

References

1941 births
2018 deaths
Estonian National Independence Party politicians
Members of the Riigikogu, 1992–1995
20th-century naturalists
21st-century naturalists
Recipients of the Order of the White Star, Medal Class
People from Tartu
Politicians from Tartu